Estadio José Antonio Romero Feris is football stadium in Corrientes, Argentina. Opened on July 26, 1986, the stadium has a capacity of 15,700 people. It is primarily used is for football matches. It is the home of the Textil Mandiyú football team of the Asociación del Fútbol Argentino in the Torneo Argentino B league.

Events
Luis Miguel November 7, 2010 (Luis Miguel Tour)

See also
List of football clubs in Argentina
Argentine football league system

References

Estadio Jose Antonio Romero Feris
Football venues in Argentina
Textil Mandiyú
Sports venues in Argentina